FC Sputnik Kimry was a Russian football team from Kimry. It played professionally in 1991 and 1992, taking 15th place in Zone 4 of the Russian Second Division in 1992.

External links
  Team history at KLISF

Association football clubs established in 1992
Association football clubs disestablished in 1993
Defunct football clubs in Russia
Sport in Tver Oblast
1992 establishments in Russia
1993 disestablishments in Russia